Wallace Andre "Shorty" Barr (November 30, 1897 – April 26, 1957) was a professional American football player in the National Football League (NFL) for the Racine Legion and the Milwaukee Badgers. He was also a player-coach for the NFL's renamed Racine Tornadoes in 1926.

On November 25, 1923, as the quarterback for the Legion, Barr was tackled twice in the end zone during a game against the Chicago Cardinals causing the Cards to register a pair of safeties in the only four-point game in NFL history. The Legion won the game though 10–4. In 1924 Barr punted 40 times for Racine and averaged 65 yards per punt.

References

 More Rare Football Scores

1897 births
1957 deaths
American football quarterbacks
Milwaukee Badgers players
Racine Legion coaches
Racine Legion players
Racine Tornadoes players
Wisconsin Badgers football players
Players of American football from Milwaukee